Simply Irresistible may refer to:

 "Simply Irresistible" (song), a 1988 song by Robert Palmer
 Simply Irresistible (film), a 1999 film starring Sarah Michelle Gellar
 "Simply Irresistible", a story by Miranda Lee
 Simply Irresistible, a 2010 novel by Jill Shalvis